This article shares a list of characters in the American remake of the supernatural drama-comedy television series Being Human. This series is based on the British hit series of the same name.  The show stars Sam Witwer, Sam Huntington, and Meaghan Rath as three characters in their twenties sharing a house in Boston, trying to live a normal social life, despite being a vampire, a werewolf, and a ghost, respectively.

Main characters

Aidan Waite
Aidan Waite (Sam Witwer) is the American counterpart of Mitchell from the original British series, named after the actor who played Mitchell in the original series. He is a quiet, calm, soft-spoken, and somewhat jaded vampire who is 257 years old, having been sired by Bishop during the American Revolution. Though he attempted to live with his wife Suzanna and their son Isaac, Aidan ends up losing them due to a preacher who lusts for Suzanna and ultimately drowns her on the grounds that she is a witch. After taking revenge on the clergyman, Aidan became Bishop's right hand and aided him until the 1950s when he no longer believed in Bishop's conviction to the vampire cause and decided to resist the urge to feed upon humans. While in Montreal in the 1970s, Aidan met Celine and had a relationship with her.

In the time before the beginning of the series, originally out of pity, Aidan saves Josh from being tormented by Marcus and before the two became good friends with Aidan getting Josh a job as an orderly at Boston's Suffolk County Hospital, where Aidan has been working as a nurse. The two later become roommates with a mutual intent to fit back into society. The series begins with Aidan relapsing into his blood-drinking ways with fellow nurse Rebecca, Aidan is forced to call Bishop and Marcus to clean up his unintentional murder before later learning they turned Rebecca into a vampire. While organizing a neighborhood watch association to deal with a local vandal, Aidan ends up catching the attention of a police officer who is the son of a man he killed in the past. Though he tries to erase the officer's memory of him so Bishop could not turn him, Aidan later learns of the officer's suicide. Aidan also attempts to help Rebecca by setting up a co-dependent relationship, feasting on each other's blood rather than live blood, but she eventually backs out.

When Aidan discovers that Bishop has begun recruiting new vampires from dying hospital patients against his wishes, he confronts the hospital chaplain who has been turned into a vampire by Bishop while he was dying of terminal cancer. Aidan manages to de-fang the chaplain, rendering him unable to feed on blood any more. Rebecca later acts on Bishop's order to sway Aidan's thoughts on her by sending him a DVD where she has sex with a man before draining him dry of blood. Though he promises Josh and Sally that he will get rid of the DVD, Aidan secretly keeps it. This results in a nasty turn of events when Aidan forms a bond with a neighborhood child named Bernie, who reminds him of Isaac, and the boy accidentally finds Rebecca's DVD with Aidan branded a sex offender and unable to save Bernie after he was mortally wounded. When he learns that Rebecca turned Bernie into a vampire, though seeing not good to come from it, Aidan decides to accept until a scheme by Bishop and Marcus force Aidan to reluctantly kill Bernie on the notion that he murdered his bullies.

With a furious Rebecca refusing to help him when Josh is abducted by the vampires to serve in a dog fight to entertain the Dutch, Aidan joins back up with Bishop as the Dutch are arriving to deal with the latter for increasing the vampire population in Boston. But ultimately discovering that Bishop has planned for the Dutch's betrayal by drugging them with juniper-laced blood in his blood den workers, Aidan is able to only save Heggeman with Rebecca's help once she learns the truth of Bernie's death being arranged by Marcus. After Heggeman leaves to tell the other vampire clans of Bishop's planned coup, Aidan honors Rebecca's wish to die rather than live as a vampire.

Several days later, Aidan is reunited with an elderly Celine, learning she came to Boston to live with her daughter while she receives treatment for lung cancer, even though she does not plan on living through the treatment. He offers to turn her into a vampire, but she declines while hiding the actual reason why she did not leave Montreal with him. Later that night, saving the house and Sally from a fire set by Danny, Aidan is almost staked in the heart by Bishop when he crashes through their living room window. Josh has Nora treat Aidan, without telling any specifics, but he remains weak and Bishop plans on fighting him, notifying him through Josh. Celine goes to comfort Aidan, and decides to offer him her blood. Reluctantly, Aidan drains Celine of her blood, killing her, but allowing him to heal completely. Expecting that Josh would attempt to fight for him, Aidan has Sally trap Josh in the hospital basement while he decapitates Bishop in their fight to the death.

After Heggeman crowns him as the new head of the Boston vampires, Aidan learns that Mother wants to meet with him over the matter of Bishop's orphaned vampires. When Aidan suggests the orphans can be reformed, Mother decides that the orphans should all be culled and that Aidan will not lead Boston, but instead assist her daughter Suren in taking over with his freedom from vampire society as a reward. As his first task for Suren, Aidan is told to turn Cecilia, a cop she has met, to serve as their new police liaison. Aidan refuses, knowing he will bleed Cecilia dry, and ends up at a bar where he meets Julia, a new doctor hired by Suffolk County Hospital, and begins an intimate relationship with her. Aidan begins using donated blood to satisfy his blood lusts while with Julia to keep her safe. However, when it is revealed that Julia is the same Julia who was Josh's ex-fiancé, and when the hospital puts higher security on the blood supply, Aidan breaks up with her. After suffering blood withdrawals, Aidan ends up starting a relationship with Suren while learning his protégé Henry Duram, who was responsible for Suren being buried alive eighty years ago, is organizing Bishop's orphans. Suffering visions of Bishop from over drinking blood, Aidan tracks down Henry and finds himself unable to kill his "son" while deciding to help Henry find a way to reintegrate him into vampire society.

Aidan's plans, however, are waylaid with various troubles that include Suren questioning Cecilia's disappearance and Atlee investigating what became of Heggeman, the former revealed to be the work of Brynn and Connor McLean who Aidan decides to blame for Heggeman's death. Forced to leave Cecilia to be killed, Aidan kills Connor the next day and presents his corpse to Atlee while telling the vampire to never come back to Boston. A week later, while helping Sally with her Reaper issue, Aidan learns that Suren has lied to Mother about culling all of Bishop's orphans. Aidan approaches Henry to gather all of the orphans at the house of a man who sells passage through the threshold so he may save the orphans and reintegrate Henry into vampire society. That night, he offers the orphans passage to Baltimore, where the vampires have no hold, before rushing himself and Henry out of the house. Unbeknownst to Henry and the orphans, Suren has had her living representative purchase the house from the man and has all of the vampires uninvited, causing them to crumble into ash. Aidan presents Henry to Suren who takes her revenge for his actions 80 years ago by flaying him alive. Aidan brings the skinned Henry to the brownstone, so he may recuperate while on the blood of Beth and Holly. However, when Aidan's mental coercion starts to wear off on the girls, he is forced to kill them with Henry able to fully heal by taking his fill.

When Aidan confronted by Josh over Henry, the two put their differences aside to help Sally as she is possessed by the Reaper by revealing their true natures to Zoe. During that time, when he falls into temptation after Zoe is knocked out, Josh convinces Aidan to take his blood instead. Though Aidan feels a buzz after drinking, he starts convulsing in pain from the werewolf blood, vomiting and letting out an earsplitting scream that manages to snap Sally out of it. With the house unlocked, Josh leaves and Aidan, with blood oozing from his orifices, goes to rest. Sometime later, Aidan and Suren feel confident that they have been working to fulfill Mother's requirements of the two of them, so Aidan begins to teach Suren how to live as he does among humans. After an awkward dinner date with Josh and Julia, during which Suren realizes Aidan and Julia were once together, Aidan reassures Suren that she will always have a place in his life. However, when Mother comes to Boston to congratulate the two on fulfilling their duties, Aidan learns his freedom is actually an excommunication from vampire society under penalty of death. However, Aidan has Henry get a message to Suren so they may live on the run together.

While at a small motel with Suren, Aidan attempts to get Atlee's help in providing him and Suren refuge from Mother. But after making a deal, Aidan finds that Suren returned to Boston to protect Aiden from Mother's wrath. Refusing to give up, Aidan decides to assassinate Mother with Henry's help. Unfortunately, Aidan falls into Mother's trap before being used as a final test for Suren to prove herself as Mother's successor. But after watching Suren get staked when she cannot follow through, Aidan is sentenced to be buried alive. Before he is buried alive, Aidan tells Mother that he will be fine, but she will be the one to live with the fact that she has killed the only person who has ever unconditionally loved her. For a few months, Aidan fights to maintain his sanity until a human takes him out, only to sell his "pure" blood to diseased vampires. However, as news of Aidan's return circulates around Boston, Atlee arrives at the location Aidan is being held captive and rescues him. Aidan then learns that a flu most humans have contracted is killing off all of the vampires, who believe his blood may be able to cure them, as he has not fed from disease-stricken humans. Yet, Atlee soon reveals that he has rescued Aidan only to serve the diseased Council, and as Aidan vehemently objects Atlee decides he would not be able to provide enough blood for all Council members so he attempts to take what blood he can, but after seeing Aidan's blood has not cured him of his disease he ultimately ends up disintegrating. Aidan is then left at the side of the road, seeing visions of his friends and Bishop before the former find him.

As Aidan learns more about the disease and how few vampires there are left he stumbles across Henry once more, learning that he is now happily in a relationship with a human who was not affected by the flu killing off all vampires, and after Henry offers Aidan to feed from her Aidan discovers that Henry had merely compelled her and he is holding her captive. Aidan attempts to reason with Henry on how what he's doing is wrong and he is stronger than such behavior, but Henry refuses to let her go and Aidan must release her secretly. After Henry becomes aware of her disappearance he chooses to trust Aidan on his survival, waiting as Aidan delivers "clean" human for him to feed from, however, in a bout of weakness Henry feeds from a tainted bag of blood at the hospital and soon after becomes diseased. Aidan is then forced to watch him die as Henry does not want any more of Aidan's help, coping by having an impromptu party. Eventually Aidan resumes his job at the hospital where he meets Kenneth, or Kenny, a teenage boy who has Severe Combined Immunodeficiency Disorder and must live within an airtight chamber. After befriending Kenny, Aidan accidentally reveals his vampire nature and Kenny pleads for him to turn him into a vampire once he turns eighteen. Aidan refuses to curse Kenny, however, once another vampire, Blake, agrees to turn Kenny in exchange for all the clean blood she may want Aidan decides to save Kenny from her grips and promises to turn him once he is of age.

Sally Malik
Sally Malik (Meaghan Rath) is the American counterpart to Annie Sawyer from the original British series. She is a bubbly and sarcastic but insecure ghost who haunts the house she and her fiancé lived in while she was alive, and is unwilling to leave it due to not being sure how to "move on". Sally appears in the clothes she was wearing when she died which change subtly depending on her state of mind. She is introduced as a very insecure ghost who does not trust herself to unlock the past with her ex-fiancé Danny, although she does not believe he did anything wrong. She possesses the power to move objects with her mind, shake the house she lives in with Aidan and Josh, can alter the pipe lines in the house, and can project thoughts into others' minds (she does so to warn her friend, Bridget).

Sally is at first finally glad that Josh and Aidan can see her, and Aidan finds another ghost to teach Sally how she can leave the house and do more with her ghostly powers, and reveals that once they are done on Earth, they receive a door to the other side. She first uses her newfound freedom to stay with Danny until he begins dating their once mutual friend Bridget. Sally tries to break them up until Josh helps her realize that she has to move on just like they have. Things take a turn for the worse when a plumber Danny has hired to fix the pipes in the house that Sally has been subconsciously clogging. The plumber reveals a ring in one of the sinks, which Danny and Sally recognize as her engagement ring. This triggers Sally's memories of the events that actually led to her death. Sally had taken the ring off to wash up before bed when it fell into the bathroom sink's drain. Danny became enraged that she was taking it off, believing she was dating other men, and yelled at her and gave her a push that made her fall down the stairs to her death. Later that day, she uses her poltergeist powers to enact revenge on Danny, wrecking his apartment and leaving a spiral of debris in the middle of the room, ending with her ring. When Danny begins to try to get rid of the ring, only for it to fall into Sally's possession, and becoming one of the only objects she can physically manipulate. She uses this to continue to torment Danny, but inadvertently causes him to harm Bridget when he believes Bridget is the one who continues to make the ring return, prompting Bridget to give the ring to Josh and Aidan. Sally attempts to retaliate for Bridget's injury, but Danny taunts her, realizing that she is haunting him and that he is not scared. She attempts to tell Bridget that Danny is the one that killed her, but Danny tells a lie about the events leading to the death, and Bridget tells Sally to stay out of their new life.

Aidan introduces Sally to a closed-off wing of the hospital where several lost souls gather to try to get their message to their loved ones when they die. This leads Sally to meet Nick, a teaching assistant she had a crush on while she was in college who has also since died. They go on dates, but when Nick disappears in a rush, Sally goes out to find him where he is reliving his death from when he drowned in a boating accident. Sally tries to help him, but he helps her realize that she should not take on his problems on top of her own. Sally also meets a vindictive ghost who constantly torments her ex-boyfriend, which makes Sally unsure of how she has been treating Danny. Later, Danny and Bridget return to the house after Sally has stopped haunting them, only to have brought along a medium with them who Danny has asked to exorcise Sally from the house. Sally finds herself unable to fight back, but in one last-ditch effort manages to possess the medium and lashes out at Danny through her body. When Sally is ejected, the medium now knows what Danny did to Sally and ends the exorcism rites knowing that Danny will get what he deserves from a now freed and scarier looking Sally (Josh would later compare her to the vengeful ghost from The Grudge).

Sally manages to cause Danny to cut himself with a straight razor, regaining her normal appearance and realizing that the vengeful ghost she met earlier was right in how she was to act. However, Danny comes to the house and confronts Sally, revealing that the exorcist Ilana had told him that there was another way to get rid of a ghost: by destroying the place it haunts. He begins to set fire to the house, but Sally manages to trap him in with her long enough for Aidan and Josh to return, both revealing their supernatural abilities to Danny. Aidan threatens to kill him, at Sally's behest, but Josh convinces them that Sally does not need blood on her hands. Instead, Sally appears too Danny and threatens that he does not confess to her murder, she will make his life a living hell. Danny turns himself in for the arson as well as Sally's murder the year before, and as everyone is celebrating their good fortunes, Sally's door to the other side appears. She is hesitant to go through, but is interrupted when Bishop attacks Aidan. She goes to help him, but when she returns to the house the door is gone and she also discovers that she can interact with other physical objects. Sally uses this newfound power to trap Josh in his room under the hospital and to distract Bishop long enough for Aidan to kill him.

After reuniting with her friend Stevie at her high school reunion, she confronts the recently deceased former prom queen, making her find her own Door. To make her feel better, Stevie tells her ghosts can sleep and dream, but when she tries it later she encounters a dark force that she believes is out to get her. While spending time with Stevie and his friends Dylan and friend "Boner", she learns that ghosts can possess humans who are willing, or otherwise inebriated. Stevie warns her not too, but she follows Dylan and Boner to enjoy having a physical body. Dylan suggests they should have sex, but Sally knows that it is essentially raping the body she has borrowed. He forces himself on her until Stevie pulls them out of their bodies, leading to a fight where Stevie "shreds" Dylan, removing his spiritual essence permanently. Sally finds this disconcerting, and Stevie disappears on her afterward.

Sally goes to the hospital to accompany Josh and Aidan at work. While looking in the nursery, she is approached by nurse Zoe Gonzalez, a human who can see ghosts. Zoe oversees the nursery so she can decide if ghosts are worthy of being reincarnated into babies. Sally tries to convince her to let her be reincarnated and even has her meet with Josh and Aidan to plead her case, but because she nearly killed Danny, Zoe turns her down. Sally tries to plead with her, as she believes she is being followed by the dark entity from her dreams, but Zoe will not hear of it. At the hospital, after a janitor cleans up a line of salt Zoe uses to keep ghosts out of the nursery, Sally tries to take things into her own hands, but the dark entity attacks her. Sally later recalls these events to Zoe who agrees to help her out. During this time, Sally is reunited with her mother Rena who has recently died in the hospital. Their reunion is made short when Rena only wants to spend time with their old neighbor and secret lover Jerry. Rena later expresses that she is upset that Sally is still living in the house that she was murdered in, before she reunites with Jerry. While talking to Zoe, Sally realizes she has become smitten with new doctor Tim Forest, and Sally does her best to coach Zoe into a date with the doctor. Zoe also convinces Sally to attend the support group she holds for ghosts, where Sally meets with Nick, again. Believing they have reconciled after their breakup, Sally gloats about the events to Zoe who reveals that Nick is her boyfriend. When Nick confirms this, Sally's heart is broken, until she encounters Dr. Forest with his girlfriend Janet. Sally uses the opportunity to possess Janet so she can feel Dr. Forest's love for his girlfriend. However, this begins to weaken her. Aidan warns her to stop, but she does not heed the warning and gets stuck in Janet, without any actual knowledge of the woman. Dr. Forest's mother comes to visit, but Sally's erratic behavior in Janet's body culminates when the dark entity attacks her, separating her from Janet's body. Later, Janet comes to the brownstone, with Josh still believing Sally is stuck in her body, but Sally reveals she is not, causing them distress as Janet seems to have taken some of Sally's memories. Sally goes to console her, but Janet is feverishly drawing the dark entity that attacked Sally, labeling one of the drawings as "Reaper".

When Aidan informs Sally that her mother is dying, Sally is jarred. When her mother passes, they reunite but at her mom's funeral, Sally sees her kissing the ghost of their neighbor, who died a decade earlier, and realizes the two had been having an affair. The two ghosts come over for a "dinner" party as Sally has it out with her mother, not happy about all this and saying she does not want to see her mom again.

Sometime later, poltergeist activity starts up in the house, which Aidan and Josh blame on Sally, but she claims she is not responsible. Things escalate when Sally is attacked by an unseen force that has Danny's voice. She goes to see Aidan, believing that Danny has sent a "Reaper" after her, but Aidan discovers Danny died while in prison. He teaches her to use iron to disperse ghosts, which she attempts to use on Danny when he appears in front of her. However, Danny's death in prison has made him stronger, leading to him gaining the upper hand. She is saved by the entity she believes is the Reaper, who soon takes on a human form to talk to her, saying that her passing up the Door has caused an unbalance that he needs to right. He gives Sally a week to say her goodbyes, but he instead finds a loophole that will let her live, so long as she becomes the new Reaper. Her first task is to reap Stevie, who the Reaper claims has shredded Boner as well and that he is waiting for his high school bully to die to shred him. When Stevie admits he might shred the bully, the Reaper shreds him in front of Sally. However, when Boner appears to Sally asking where Stevie went, she becomes suspicious. Zoe and Nick suggest she seek out the help of the support group, but the Reaper appears and shreds all of the ghosts, and Zoe becomes fearful of her. Nick goes to see her, saying she needs help, but Sally believes the Reaper is after her when it appears again and starts to shred Nick. She pleads with the Reaper to stop, leading to the Reaper to reveal that he does not really exist and is only a figment of her imagination. Sally realizes she has been shredding ghosts, and shreds Nick, before attacking Josh and Aidan, but Aidan uses a fire poker to disperse her.

With Sally out cold, the boys approach Zoe for help, but the Reaper takes over, trapping everyone in the house while Aidan is going through blood withdrawals and it is also the night of the full moon. Zoe goes into Sally's mind to try to free everyone before Aidan relapses or Josh turns, finding Sally in an intricate fantasy where she is alive and the Reaper is her fiancé "Scott" who is pressing her to move out of the brownstone, so he may actually take over her ghostly body. Zoe manages to get through to Sally who realizes the fantasy is not where she should be, taking control of her spiritual form once more and freeing everyone. However, Scott reappears, reminding Sally that he is a part of her and will be waiting for her to slip, again.

While doing her best to try to ignore "Scott", Sally learns that Janet has been committed to Suffolk County Hospital's psychiatric ward, Sally pleads with Josh to talk to Janet through him so she can free her, as "Scott" presses her to give up hope. Just as Sally runs out of hope, Nora helps her speak to Janet, and once Janet learns the truth, Sally feels a weight lifted, and "Scott" disappears. Sally's next step is to apologize to Zoe, but Zoe has given up doing anything concerning ghosts since Sally's actions under the Reaper's influence. Sally's pestering gets through to her, just as a solar eclipse causes the ghosts Sally has shredded to reappear. Sally reminds Zoe that she shredded Nick in the house she shares with Josh and Aidan and promises to meet her there. Sally finds Nick, and Danny, are both back, where Nick reveals that he and the others are in an existence that keeps them prisoner, home to both shredded ghosts and those who take other ghosts' Doors. But when Zoe arrives, Nick says he is at peace, making her happy just as the eclipse ends. When Aidan and Josh have their plans to save their loved ones, Sally possesses Ray's wife to lure him into the woods where Josh can kill him, but the Reaper appears once more, as she slipped. Sally seeks out her mother Rena's help, asking her to shred her so she can go to Limbo to save the others, just as Nora finds her where Sally reveals the truth. Sally returns to the house to find her mother waiting for her, realizing that Sally has become so strong in death and she is proud of her, just as her mother's Door appears. Knowing that Sally can take her door, Rena offers it to her so she can go to Limbo, as the Reaper eggs her on to give into another wrong desire. While grateful, Sally takes matters into her own hands and shreds herself, destroying the Reaper along with her own essence. Later, as Aidan is being buried and Josh is in his standoff with Ray and Nora, Sally's voice comes on over a radio in the house, revealing she has made it into Limbo but she needs her friends' help to get out.

In the season 3 premiere, Sally is in limbo, trying her hardest to try to get back to the other side. She is with Nick, who is constantly drowning again, and Stevie, who is hanging from a tree and watching his family go on without him, while her eternal punishment is fruitlessly trying to get back to the other side. Josh and Nora call upon the witch Ms. Gilchrist who they believe will bring Sally's spirit back, but instead, she brings Sally's soul back into her body, bringing her back to life, along with Stevie and Nick by association with Sally.

In season 4, Sally is discovering her new powers now being half-witch and also finding herself romantically involved with Aidan.

Josh Levison
Joshua "Josh" Levison (Sam Huntington) is the American counterpart of George Sands. He is a neurotic, socially-awkward hospital worker with a heart of gold who suffers from being a werewolf; transforming once a month on every full moon. In the first episode, it is revealed that he chose to leave his family because of his situation, having been gone from them for about two years now. Josh wavers between wanting a normal life, and feeling that he needs to isolate himself as much as possible because that life is impossible for him because of what he is. He ends up finding his sister one day at the hospital, who was visiting her girlfriend, and she tries to find out why he left and pry herself back into his life. Josh tries to distance himself as much as possible from her, for fear of what might happen if she finds out what he is. One full moon, however, she follows him to the place he transforms in, determined to find out what he is trying to hide from her. Josh tries to get her to leave only for her to shut the door and still try to stay. Full of fear that he might kill her once in his wolf state, he calls Aidan and Sally for help, and Aidan ends up coming to the rescue to pull her out just in time. He tells her that Josh has some unspecified medical condition, and takes her away to safety. The following day when Emily tries to talk to Josh about what happened, Josh rejects his sister and tells her not to contact him again for her own good.

When Josh meets Ray, who reveals that he is another werewolf, Aidan has Ray teach Josh how to survive as a werewolf in the modern world and avoid detection, eventually leading Josh to hit on a nurse at the hospital named Nora, although she rejects his advances as potential sexual harassment. Although Josh is reluctant at first, he and Ray hit it off until Ray convinces him to attack the vampires' blood den, with Josh attacking Bishop's second in command Marcus. However, Josh later has Ray leave his life after Ray reveals that he was the one who turned Josh into a werewolf in the first place. Some time later, Emily moves in with Josh and Aidan when she breaks up with her girlfriend. Aidan takes her to a bar to rebound where she is ambushed by Marcus in an attempt to get back at Aidan. Josh and Emily return to their parents' house, where his psychologist father confronts him about how he believes Josh is suffering from clinical lycanthropy due to Josh's extensive journals where he has been trying to seek out a cure.

After Josh shows his kinder side to Nora, she begins to reciprocate his feelings, and when she confronts him about his flightiness in their relationship on the verge of a full moon, they have sex. He tries to scale back the relationship once more, when he begins to have nightmares about transforming into a werewolf and harming Nora, but he ultimately decides to stay with her. Shortly after, Josh is captured by thousand-year-old vampires and put into a werewolf version of a dogfight. He wins, killing the other wolf, Douglas, and this causes great emotional trauma. He protests alongside Sally to Aidan going back to Bishop's "family", even though Aidan says it is the only way to free Josh from the vampires. When he returns to see Nora, she reveals she is pregnant with his child, and Josh decides it is best for him to be there for her. When Nora suspects the child has a birth defect due to strange hormone levels, Josh worries that he has passed on lycanthropy to his child, but an ultrasound reveals that the baby is healthy, although twice as far along in the pregnancy than they thought. After this discovery as well as Sally's resolution of her issues, he decides to return to medical school and become a doctor to support Nora and his child, but this celebration is cut short by Bishop's attack on Aidan. Josh makes the decision to kill Bishop, but Sally reveals that Aidan had asked her to keep Josh out of the fight, and she traps him in the hospital basement. Nora discovers Josh in his hospital hiding place where he is transforming, and he accidentally scratches her as he ushers her out of the room. He transforms into the wolf completely in front of Nora, and reveals the truth to her later, although she hides the fact that she was scratched and infected in the process.

On the next full moon, with Nora now part of the house, Josh prepares for his next transformation, with Nora inquisitive about the events. That night, Josh is driven out to the woods by Nora, who initially feels relieved that she is not a werewolf, but she begins to transform in the car. Josh realizes she is in danger, but Heggeman appears and shoots Josh with a silver bullet, having been tasked by Mother to kill Josh to free Aidan of distractions. Injured, but not shot directly, Josh tries to get away but Nora, who has fully transformed, kills Heggeman and saves Josh. The next day, Josh and Nora attend a mixer for MIT students, but Nora's erratic behavior after the change raises eyebrows, until she reveals that she has miscarried their baby. This prompts Josh to un-matriculate from med school so he may focus on curing themselves. To this end, he rents out two storage units and buys camera equipment to film them during the change. Nora is reluctant at first, particularly after Josh's ex-fiancée Julia comes to town and is revealed to be Aidan's current lover. After Nora confronts him that he wanted to keep Julia safe from the wolf, but not her, he is worried that she will be in danger, particularly after she reveals that she remembers the events of her first change. However, Nora appears at the storage facility later, convinced that she is a danger at the full moon.

Near the next full moon, Josh is approached at work by a young woman named Brynn who reveals that her twin brother Connor has been put in the psych ward, and that they are both werewolves. Josh reluctantly frees Connor, who comes to thank him later by taking him out to an upscale dance club. Connor and Brynn reveal that they are purebred werewolves, born rather than changed. When Josh mentions he is seeking a cure, Connor offers to fund the research necessary. When Josh mentions he is looking for the trigger that activates the change, Connor and Brynn reveal they want to be wolves all the time, which initially turns Josh off from their offer, but he reconsiders. Josh introduces Nora to the twins in the same week that Nora's abusive ex-boyfriend Will comes to town. As the full moon is near, Josh is convinced by Connor to retaliate against Will for hurting Nora, attacking him during the day until Nora interferes. Josh backs off, realizing he would be no better than Will if he seriously hurt him, unaware that Nora has been giving into her animal desires and stalking Will. That night, Josh goes to the storage unit while Nora, Connor, and Brynn attack Will as their wolves.

The next day, police ask about his whereabouts, but he cannot tell them the truth. They reveal they are actually looking for Nora, who has been absent since the full moon. After trying to get in contact with Nora through the twins, who piss him off, Josh tries to get help from Aidan, as they have a new vampire cop liaison, but Aidan is distracted by visions of Bishop. Josh takes things into his own hands, contacting Cecilia himself, and offering up the twins to her as the werewolves who killed Heggeman. When the detectives find him at the storage unit, Cecilia shows up and uses her abilities to convince the detectives that Josh is not responsible. That night, Josh follows through on his end of the deal, leading Cecilia to the twins. Nora arrives at work a week later, on the night of another full moon, and is surprised when Josh says he tried to contact her through the twins, but they would not send along the message. After Nora meets the twins, she reveals to Josh that the twins believe Aidan sent Cecilia after them after she covered up the murder. That night, Josh arrives to a cabin the twins and Nora use to change in, when Aidan also arrives, as he is looking for Cecilia. The wolves reveal they have hidden Cecilia in the woods so they may hunt Aidan as the wolves, when Josh reveals he is the one who sent Cecilia after them. All four transform and hunt down Aidan and Cecilia, and end up killing Cecilia when she gives up so Aidan may live.

The next morning, Nora reveals that they only met because Josh wanted to be human, but her transformation has made her embrace her wolf self. This causes them to break up, leading to Emily to come to Boston to try to bring Josh back to his former self. They plan to go drinking, but when he leaves work early, he finds that Emily has been out drinking with Julia. Josh and Julia trade jabs over drinks until Emily needs to be taken back to Julia's place. Julia demands to know why Josh left, and he admits that after the attack he became a monster (without elaborating on being a werewolf) and that he did not want to hurt her. At work, Josh and Julia agree to become friends, just as Josh is met by the ghost of his friend Stu who died in the werewolf attack. Stu tries to push Josh and Julia apart, as he knows it will put Julia in danger, but when Julia starts to fall in love with Josh, again, Stu takes over Josh's body and has sex with Julia. When Josh awakes to realize what has happened, he is angry at Stu for using him, as he can either put Julia in danger of the wolf or break her heart, again. When Julia wakes up to cuddle up with Josh, he ultimately decides to stay with her, as he is still in love with her. When he returns home, he finds Aidan seeing Henry (who Josh had seen without his skin) and a moving company off, realizing that Henry could only have healed after drinking blood, which he sees in the moving boxes. They fight until they walk inside to see Sally shred Nick. After they approach Zoe to save Sally, the Reaper entity traps them all in the house. That night is the full moon, so they work fast to try to free Josh, who can only think of the blood still lingering in the house, and the fear he may kill Zoe. Josh rushes to lock himself into the fridge if they cannot save Sally, but has to offer up his blood to Aidan to save Zoe when he tries to feed on her. Josh's blood seems to  Aidan's thirst until he violently reacts to it. The events help save Sally from the Reaper, letting Josh leave the house to transform in the woods.

Josh wants his relationship with Julia to advance, so he invites her over to the house for dinner, even though Aidan has broken her heart. Aidan invites Suren over, and after an awkward dinner where Suren realizes Julia and Aidan were together, events turn out better. Just as their relationship grows, Nora returns to Boston, seeking her old job at the hospital, and hoping to rekindle things with Josh. However, Josh's love lies with Julia, again, even when she asks him to make sure he is making the right choice. When he finds that Nora has helped Sally, he makes up his mind. After Aidan leaves, Nora approaches him one more time to reveal Brynn has told her of a way to lift the werewolf curse. Josh has to kill the werewolf who turned him: Ray. Josh mulls this over in his mind, going as far to track Ray down where he discovers Ray has reunited with his family and now has a better life. Josh changes his mind and instead decides to tell Julia the truth, pushed even more when their old friend Chelsea comes to town and she tells him to do the same. Just as Josh begins to reveal the truth to Julia, the solar eclipse affecting the ghosts causes him to partially transform. He runs away from Julia, but when he reaches a dead end, he turns to face her just as he feels another intense pain. This causes Julia to back up into the street where she is hit by a car. Josh, still transforming, leaves the scene only to return later to find that Julia has died. As she admits she always loved him, her Door appears, and she passes through it. Josh goes to her funeral, but Emily keeps him from entering the service. As she talks to him, he receives a call from the hospital, as Nora is in observation after she was affected by the solar eclipse as well. Nora reveals she is glad that Josh did not follow through with killing his maker, as it would have cured her as well, and she knows he should not be a murderer. Josh makes his final decision to kill Ray, using Heggeman's rifle. With Aidan's promise that he will meet up with him at the shack in the woods, Sally helps Josh lure Ray to the woods by possessing Ray's wife. With Ray fallen into the trap, Josh leads him to the shack where he plans on killing him, but Nora, who has learned the truth from Sally, distracts him, causing Ray to escape. As Josh chases him, Ray knocks him down, preparing to kill Josh as well. Nora arrives with a gun of her own, and the three end up in a standoff: Ray with the rifle aimed at Josh, Nora with a handgun aimed at Ray, and Josh telling Nora to kill him instead. Both guns are heard going off after the scene changes.

In the season 3 premiere, it is revealed that the shots fired were one into Ray, grazing him, and the other flying off into the night. Ray then turns on Nora, and Josh uses the confusion to bludgeon Ray to death. During the next full moon, Josh is revealed to be cured of his lycanthropy, but the same cannot be said of Nora. They spend the next 15 months trying to find both Aidan and Sally, and Josh has advanced his medical degree and works at Suffolk County Hospital in a residency. They go to the witch Ms. Gilchrist who asks of them to bring her the heart of someone they have killed to bring Sally back, so they retrieve Ray's heart for the incantation, and then Sally's body from her grave. Josh is later survives an attack by Liam a full blooded werewolf, and later gains the ability to transform without the full moon and retain some control over himself demonstrated when he doesn't attack Nora. Josh and Nora then become married and later have twins.

James Bishop
James Bishop (Mark Pellegrino) is the American counterpart of Herrick from the original British series. Bishop is the head of the local vampire clan and the main antagonist in season 1. Originally an Englishman who became a vampire during the 17th century, Bishop travels with his sire Carlo to the Thirteen Colonies and eventually turns Aidan, his wife Susanne, and Marcus during the American Revolution. During the 1950s, Bishop had fallen in love with a Suffolk County Hospital nurse named Jane who was aware of his vampiric nature. When the powerful Dutch vampires visit and kill off Carlo, Bishop is made the new head of the Boston clan with an ultimatum: kill Jane or leave the vampire clan to live with her. His initial hesitation leads to the schism between himself and Aidan, but he ultimately decides to stay in the vampire clan, killing Jane while she is working at the hospital.

In the present day, Bishop keeps up public "human" appearances by owning a mortuary and by acting as a lieutenant in the Boston Police Department. These positions allow him to cover up the crimes that his fellow vampires commit. It is under these circumstances that Bishop finds Aidan back in his life when Aidan accidentally kills fellow nurse Rebecca, siring her to get back at Aidan while attempting to bring him back to the fold. But when Aidan repeatedly refuses, Bishop moves forward with his plans and begins offering to turn terminal patients into vampires. Though Aidan warns him that the hospital is off-limits, offering to help him with Mike Garrity, Bishop reneges on their deal as he brought a vampire priest from outside the city to be the hospital's chaplain so he can recruit dying patients. Aidan responds by defanging the priest to send Bishop a message that these acts will not be tolerated.

When Marcus attacks Josh's sister, Aidan confronts Bishop, but Bishop does not reprimand Marcus, as it is the proper way to retaliate for Josh's attack on Marcus. However, when Marcus continues to seek revenge, Aidan goes back to Bishop who reveals that he has been increasing the vampire population in Boston in an attempt to reveal themselves to humanity and take over as the dominant race. He also reveals that he sees Aidan as a weakness amongst vampires, while he sees Marcus as a mistake he made. In response, having assisted in the death of Bernie's bullies to trick Aidan into killing the boy, Marcus goes to the Amish Country to reveal Bishop's plans to the Dutch. With the arrival of the Dutch in Boston, Bishop has Josh kidnapped to entertain them in a werewolf death match, releasing him after Aidan agrees to return to his side. Believing that they have come to kill him, Bishop resolves an ultimatum from the Dutch: either cull the population or die. However, during a feast the next day before he revealed that he knew Marcus told them of his plans, Bishop poisoned the Dutch with juniper, laced into the blood of feeding-den prostitutes. Savoring his triumph, Bishop proceeds to kill the paralyzed Dutch one by one before Aidan saves Heggeman who goes off to notify the other vampire clans of Bishop's betrayal.

Bishop retaliates by ambushing Aidan in his home, despite being uninvited, breaking the threshold and staying long enough to stake him before forced to leave. Fortunately, the stake narrowly misses Aidan's heart. Bishop later goes through Josh to tell Aidan that they will settle this in a fight to the death, but Josh uses the opportunity to set up the fight on the night of a full moon so he will kill Bishop. Aidan sees through this, having Sally trap Josh in the basement room so he and Bishop can fight. Having taken Celine's blood at her request, Aidan became equally matched to Bishop as he is decapitated when garroted by barbed wire. However, whenever Aidan drinks too much live blood, a hallucination of Bishop reappears. He pushes Aidan to hunt down Henry to kill him, but when Aidan cannot follow through, the vision of Bishop predicted this, as the father cannot kill the son.

Nora Sargeant
Nora Sargeant (Kristen Hager) is a nurse at the hospital where Josh and Aidan work. She is based on Nina Pickering from the British series. After being convinced by Ray to try having sex just before his monthly transformation, Josh awkwardly comes on to Nora and she rebuffs him by threatening sexual harassment charges against him if he ever speaks to her again. However, her opinion of Josh later changes when she sees him cheer up one of her patients on his day off, and she agrees to go on a date with him. After a series of tepid dates due to Josh being apprehensive of what will happen near the full moon, Nora confronts him just before his transformation. Overcome by animalistic urges, Josh and Nora make love. Sometime later, Nora reveals to Josh that she is pregnant with his child. In the events of the first-season finale, Nora finds Josh just as he transforms one last time, but he saves her from being attacked by his wolf form. However, the transformation also affects her pregnancy and she miscarries. The next morning, Josh tells her the truth about everything that has happened, and she accepts his apology. After he leaves, Nora checks a scratch she received from Josh after he transformed the previous night.

One month later, while she worries that she has also been infected, she continually asks Josh what happens before he transforms, fearing that she has the symptoms. Her fears are temporarily assuaged when after she drops Josh off in the woods on the next full moon rises, and she does not immediately transform. However, as she prepares to drive off, she also transforms into a werewolf as Josh is being hunted down by Heggeman. She is shown fully transformed and she kills Heggeman. When Josh learns that she has been infected by him, and that she miscarried, he decides to search for a "cure", rather than return to medical school. Now able to see Sally, Nora consoles her after her encounter with Stevie and Dylan, revealing to the audience that she knows she killed Heggeman even though she told Josh she could remember nothing of the transformation. When Josh rents out storage units for them to transform in, Nora is initially reluctant to use it so Josh may observe them during the transformation, and is turned off even more when Josh reveals she murdered Heggeman, and she reveals it's a fact she already knows. Nora's ability to remember her actions during her transformed state make her unique as a werewolf that isn't a full blood. The strain is exacerbated when Josh's ex-fiancée Julia appears in Boston, and Nora initially feels that Josh loved Julia more, as he left her when he was a werewolf and he infected her, instead. That evening, Nora finds herself by the wolf compelled to stalk Julia, but she stops herself and decides to use the storage unit.

Nora returns weeks later, asking for Josh's forgiveness, but Josh's love now lies with Julia. She tells him that Brynn changed after Connor's death, as he was the one holding her back and not the other way around. After she unsuccessfully asks for her job back, she comes across Sally who asks for her help to help Janet. Sally manages to reveal the truth to Janet through Nora, but this action causes Josh to pick Julia over her. Later, she approaches Josh to tell him that Brynn told her a way to remove the werewolf curse: Josh has to kill the werewolf that changed him. Sometime later, Josh is alerted to the fact that Nora is in the hospital, as she fell down a flight of stairs during the solar eclipse. She is happy that it happened though, because it shows her that Josh did not become a killer, as killing Ray would have lifted the curse off of both of them. However, when Sally reveals that she helped Josh lure Ray to kill him, she goes out to the woods to stop them. In the end, she has a handgun trained on Ray, who is threatening to kill Josh with the silver bullet rifle. As the scene changes, both guns are heard being shot.

In the season 3 premiere, it is revealed that Ray was killed at the hands of Josh, but a month later only he has been cured of his lycanthropy, leaving Nora a werewolf. They spend the next year trying to find both Aidan and Sally, succeeding with bringing Sally back to life with the help of the witch Ms. Gilchrist. Josh and Nora then become married and later have twins in Season 4.

Suren
Suren (Dichen Lachman) is the daughter of the powerful vampire known only as "Mother" (she is also her biological daughter). Suren is around 700 years old, and her biological father was a Mongol warrior who taught her how to skin animals and humans alike. During the 1930s, Aidan and his protégé Henry were watching over Suren, who formed a relationship with Henry when Aidan restrained himself from her affections. However, Henry could not keep himself satiated with Suren as a lover, leading to her finding him with another woman at a ball at the Halloway Hotel the night before she and Mother are to leave Boston. Killing the woman in front of a room of human onlookers, all of whom were slaughtered under Mother's order to ensure their kind's existence is not exposed, Suren is punished for jeopardizing all vampires by being placed underground for eighty years.

After Bishop's death, Mother decides to release Suren early to take over the Boston vampire instead of Aidan and is stationed in the hotel where she ironically caused the bloody massacre. With Aidan as her second in command, Suren first picks a new police liaison in Cecilia and personally sires her when Aidan refuses to. Regardless of her dissatisfaction with Aidan, she throws the Dutch out the trail when Heggeman ends up missing as a result of his death at newly transformed Nora's claws. When Suren decides to bring in a mobster into the vampire fold, Aidan protests, even though the mobster has caught one of Bishop's orphans who attacked children in broad daylight. When Aidan acquiesces later, he begins feasting on the mobster when he should be turning him. Suren is pleased at this turn of events, knowing it is what Aidan needs to become the vampire she knew ages ago and become her lover. However, Mother is less than thrilled that they have been enjoying each other rather than working and orders Suren and Aidan to hunt down Bishop's orphans. Months later, Suren has told Mother that they have culled all of the orphans, leading Aidan to use his renewed relationship with Henry to gather up the orphans. Suren, who has been watching, orders that the owner of a house who gets paid for vampires to pass the threshold to transfer ownership to her human liaison. She then orders the orphans to be uninvited, killing everyone but Henry and Aidan. Aidan later presents Henry to her, and she decides that in order to be properly punished for his actions 80 years ago, she will skin Henry alive, a painful procedure that as a vampire he will survive from.

Later, Aidan convinces Suren to experience the "mundane" aspects of his life, which begins by having dinner with Josh, Julia, and Sally. After impressing Josh with her love of Antiques Roadshow, she realizes that Aidan had been in a relationship with Julia, but puts off everyone's fears by making the situation better. That night, she expresses her fears that she does not fit in with Aidan's world, but he assuages the fears. The next day, Mother returns to Boston to express her gratitude that Suren was able to shape the city back up. She rewards her by placing her in charge of New England, while excommunicating Aidan from the vampire clans. To escape the oppression, Aidan and Suren run away together to a hotel to start, but Suren soon grows hungry. After Aidan is attacked by other vampires, she asks him to give up, and she will return to Boston. Aidan promises her that he will find a way, and he leaves Suren alone in the hotel, where she goes through withdrawal and thinks about the past. She decides to return to Boston to take her place as its leader, eventually telling Aidan that she did it to save him from Mother's oppression. At Mother's going away party, Mother names Suren as her successor, but gives her one last task to show she is truly strong: Suren must kill Aidan. Suren refuses, as she loves him, and falls to the carpet. As Mother cuddles her, she stakes Suren, and she crumbles to dust in front of Aidan.

Publicity materials for season 2 indicated that the character was to be named Izumi, but this was apparently changed during production.

Recurring characters

Season 1
Rebecca Flynt (Sarah Allen) is a fellow nurse at the hospital before she and Aidan go on a date and Aidan accidentally kills her in a vampiric blood lust. When Aidan calls Bishop to "clean up" afterwards, Bishop turns Rebecca instead with the intent of using her as a pawn to control Aidan. She fully embraces the fact that she is a vampire, flaunting her abilities and bloodlust by feeding on and killing anyone she wants without being discovered. At one point Rebecca tries to feed on Josh but as he is a werewolf, she decides against it. Once the novelty of killing starts wearing off, she approaches Aidan in an attempt to become more like him and less dependent on feeding off live humans like other vampires. However, her conviction is not strong enough and she falls back in with Bishop's clan, further involving herself in the drama between Bishop and Aidan. She is killed when she begs Aidan to stake her.  She is based on the character of Lauren in the original British series.
Marcus Damnian (Vincent Leclerc) is one of the vampires in Bishop's clan. He works at a local Boston funeral home, covering up murders perpetrated by other vampires. Marcus often and blatantly tries to one-up Aidan to prove his loyalty to Bishop, going so far as to track Josh to his family's home with the intent of murdering them all before being foiled. He is killed by Rebecca to prevent him from killing Aidan as well as revenge for having been behind the death of Bernie. His characterization is similar to the original British role of Seth.
Emily Levison (Alison Louder) is Josh's younger sister, with whom he was very close before Josh gets bitten by a werewolf and intentionally disappears from his family. She accidentally runs into Josh while visiting her girlfriend Jackie (Rhiannon Moller-Trotter) who was a patient at the hospital in which he works, and afterward tries to re-involve herself in his life. However, when Josh nearly kills her after she unknowingly traps herself with him just before he transforms into a wolf, he demands that she never see him again. Emily later returns to seek comfort with Josh after she breaks up with Jackie, but when she is attacked by Marcus in retaliation for Josh and Ray's attack on the vampires, Josh takes Emily back to their family home, where he leaves her there after Marcus returns once more. In season 2, she tries to help Julia, Josh's ex-fiancée, and Josh get back together. Emily comforts Josh after Julia dies in a traffic accident. In season 3, Emily returns to take Josh on his bachelor party to a strip club, along with Aidan and Kenny. She discovers Josh and Aidan's secret as a werewolf and a vampire, respectively, after Aidan kills a vampire stripper to save Josh, and storms away. She later comes to accept the truth about the supernatural and returns to help get the wedding started for Josh and Nora. Despite knowing about Josh and Nora being werewolves and Aidan being a vampire, she still does not know of the existence of Sally.
Cara (Katy Breier) is an orderly hired by the hospital after Rebecca disappears. Cara is flirtatious to Aidan, but when Rebecca returns as a vampire, she feeds on Cara. Facing Rebecca's ironic action and despite her goading, Aidan refuses to turn Cara to save her, and she dies. She is based on the character Becca from the first episode of the British version.
Ray (Andreas Apergis) is an older wanderer who, as it turns out, has been covertly following Josh for some time, observing his lunar transformations. Ray reveals himself to Josh admitting that he is also a werewolf, and can teach Josh the basics of being one - including getting through the changes without killing anything. While he initially refuses the help, Aidan convinces him otherwise, and allows Ray to live with them. When Ray outstays his welcome, Josh confronts him at the next full moon where he reveals he wants to form a whole pack of werewolves, and that he was the one who attacked Josh two years prior and turned him into a werewolf. After removing Ray from his life, Josh tracks Ray down as he is under the impression that killing Ray will cure himself and Nora of the werewolf curse, but Ray has reunited with his family, giving Josh second thoughts. After Julia's death and discovering that he can cure Nora and himself, Josh lures Ray to the woods, with Sally's assistance, and holds him at gunpoint until Nora distracts him. After a scuffle, Ray gains the upper hand over Josh, and holds him at gunpoint with the silver bullet-loaded rifle, with Nora training a handgun on him. As the scene changes, both guns are heard going off. His fate is revealed in the season 3 premiere, where Josh has bludgeoned him to death with a rock, curing him of the werewolf curse. Ray's heart is later retrieved by Josh and Nora to use in the spell Ms. Gilchrist performs to bring Sally back to life. Donna then tracks down Ray's body, proclaiming that she will need to find a use for it, revealed to be as a faithful undead assistant. Ray is dispatched to kill the medium Ilana Myers after Donna suspects that Ilana has taught Sally some magical spell to fight back against her. When Josh, Aidan, and Sally enter the pocket dimension that Donna calls home, Ray is there to confront them, as Donna suspected that Sally would attempt to bring Josh with her. Ray allows Sally and Aidan to confront Donna, as his only qualms are with Josh. After a fight in which Ray appears to have the upper hand, Josh manages to taunt Ray, who has magically transformed into a werewolf without the full moon, to attack him, and manages to behead Ray during Ray's lunge, killing him once and for all. He is based on Tully from the British series.
Danny Angeli (Gianpaolo Venuta) was Sally's fiancé before her untimely death. He owned the house where Aidan and Josh live, and deeply cared for Sally while she was alive. However, it is revealed that he has a temper and is directly responsible for Sally's death. Danny becomes aware that Sally is trying to haunt him, but he taunts her saying that is not intimidated by her attempts, eventually lying to Bridget as to the events of Sally's death to thwart her plans. After he hires the exorcist Ilanato remove Sally from her haunting, Sally possesses the Ilana, revealing the true events, and causing a rift between Danny and Bridget. Danny ultimately tries to burn the house down, but Sally traps him inside, leaving Josh and Aidan to reveal that they know about what happened. He confesses his arson and murder of Sally to the police after she reveals herself to him and threatens him. When Sally believes that Danny is somehow responsible for the Reaper and the recent poltergeist events happening in the house, she and Aidan discover that he was killed by his cellmate in prison. Danny then reveals himself to Sally, having become more adept as a ghost as he was killed in prison. Just as he is about to kill her, the Reaper appears and destroys Danny's essence. He reappears during the solar eclipse, happy to see Sally after being in Limbo, to which he returns once the eclipse ends. He seems to have accepted Limbo as proper punishment for the crimes he performed against Sally in life. He is based on the character of Owen from the original British series.
Bridget (Angela Galuppo) was one of Sally's friends in life. She is based on the character of Janey in the British series. Sally discovers that she has begun trying to date Danny since her death, and Sally works to break up the relationship before Aidan convinces her not to. Sally gives Bridget her approval, and Bridget begins to help Danny move on. However, when Sally discovers that Bridget is being abused by Danny because of her haunting, she attempts to contact Bridget to reveal what happened, but Danny manages to convince Bridget otherwise. She breaks up with Danny after the exorcism goes wrong. After resolving the issue with Donna, Sally meets up with Bridget, who after the experiences with Sally in her death has joined a wicca coven, as she is upset that she may have failed Sally in death. She takes Sally to a meeting, where Sally sees that several ghosts come by to use the spiritually open women as vessels. She stops a ghost from taking over Bridget, and ends the meeting early when she dissipates the other ghost. Later, Sally tells Bridget that she should move on from the spirituality, and gives Bridget the Spirit Lock to keep her safe.
Nick Finn (Pat Kiely) was Sally's teaching assistant while she was in college. Both Sally and Nick had unrequited feelings for each other, but they manage to find each other in death, Nick having drowned in a boating accident. Nick and Sally begin dating, but Nick relives the moments of his death each and every day prefaced by a coughing fit before he explodes into a large volume of water. Nick and Sally part ways after a short time dating, but then meet up again when Zoe invites Sally to her ghost support group. Sally believes that the meeting is good and they will begin dating again, but Zoe reveals that she and Nick are intimate. After realizing that the Reaper personality is part of her, Sally shreds Nick in front of Josh and Aidan. When ghosts begin reappearing during the solar eclipse, Sally realizes that there is one more chance for Zoe to see Nick. She returns to the brownstone first, where Nick reveals that he is in a form of purgatory he is calling Limbo, home to ghosts who have been shredded or those who take the wrong Door, a place where he realizes he exists and can see, but there is nothing to experience. However, when Zoe finds him, he tells her that he is at peace now, to make Zoe feel closure. Sally helps him escape Limbo by hitching a ride back into physical life with her, along with Stevie, and he and Zoe begin a proper intimate relationship. However, he begins to decompose, much like Sally, and takes to catching stray cats in the neighborhood and eating them, which staves off his hunger and halts the process of decomposition. When Sally reveals she too has eaten a live creature, he is relieved and tries to explain that what they are doing is right. However, that night when Zoe comes home to find him eating another cat, his eyes are glazed over as he proclaims that he is only eating, but that he is still hungry and lunges for Zoe. Zoe manages to avoid death by bludgeoning Nick with a baseball bat, and he is happy that he has finally free of the hunger. His Door appears and leads him to the other side, but the golden clam shell Sally sees on the Door is later exactly the same one she sees on Stevie's. After entering Donna's pocket dimension, Sally demands that Nick and Stevie be set free, but Aidan realizes that Donna must have already eaten their souls, which she confirms.
Bernie (Jason Spevack) is the son of Aidan's neighbor Cindy. Aidan helps Bernie stand up to some neighborhood bullies and becomes fast friends with him, as Bernie reminds Aidan of his long-dead son. When Bernie finds and sneaks home (unknown by Aidan) the homemade snuff video Rebecca made for Aidan, Cindy catches Bernie watching it (before Rebecca kills the other man) and forbids Aidan from coming near her son ever, again. Sometime later, Bernie is accidentally hit by a car and dies, but is turned by Rebecca into a vampire in an effort to cheer Aidan up by giving him a new family. When it appears that Bernie has killed the two bullies that used to pick on him, Bishop berates Aidan about the dead boys and the consequences of turning a child into a vampire, leaving Aidan no choice but to kill Bernie more mercifully with a wooden stake himself. It is later revealed that Bishop had Marcus kill the boys and make it appear that Bernie was the perpetrator.
Ilana Myers (Ellen David) is an exorcist hired by Danny to rid Sally from the house. She goes through the motions, slowly weakening Sally through the rite, until Sally possesses her in a fit of desperation, revealing the truth behind her death. Years later, Ilana is hired by Josh and Nora in their attempts to bring Sally back from Limbo, but she cannot help and in fact fears the house. She instead directs them to find Ms. Gilchrist.  She later meets Sally, face to face, for the first time and helps her learn how to fight Donna.  Ilana is killed by Ray, who is sent by Donna to do her dirty work, for helping Sally.
Heggeman (Terry Kinney) is a member of a group of powerful elder vampires called "the Dutch", due to their Dutch origins and habit of living and hibernating in Pennsylvania Dutch country. Well over a thousand years old, Heggeman is one of the oldest-living vampires and commands great fear and respect. Heggeman is a very strong proponent of vampire traditions and does not look favorably on actions he deems "abnormal" (such as having a relationship with a human). When the Dutch last came to Boston, Bishop's sire Carlo (Lorne Brass) was killed and Bishop made the head of the Boston vampire family if he broke off his relationship with Jane (Lena Kleine). They return to Boston after Marcus reveals that Bishop is trying to increase vampire numbers to bring them into the public and overtake humans as the dominant species. Due to their old-fashioned ways, the Dutch are nearly all killed by Bishop, with Heggeman saved by Aidan at the last moment. After Aidan kills Bishop, Heggeman gives him control of the Boston vampires and informs him that "she" wants to see him.
Celine (Nathalie Breuer, Laurence Leboeuf in the past) is a woman from Montreal that Aidan fell in love with in the 1970s after he left Boston. In the past, she pushed for Aidan to turn her into a vampire, but he was not willing to give that life to her. When Bishop finds them, Aidan plans for the two of them to leave town so Bishop cannot harm her, but they fight as Celine does not want to leave her family. When she leaves the house later that night, Bishop intercepts her and has his way with her and feeds from her, forcing her to never tell anyone or else he will harm her family. Celine meets up with Aidan in the present day when she goes to Suffolk County Hospital to spend her final days since her lung cancer has become terminal. Aidan's feelings for her resurface and he tells her he will turn her into a vampire, but she declines as she does not want to watch her loved ones grow old and die while she cannot. After Aidan is mortally wounded by Bishop, she offers herself to Aidan so she can die in peace and he can regain his strength. She is mentioned on several occasions and is also seen in flashbacks. She is based on Josie from the British series.

Season 2
Stevie Adkins (Robert Naylor) is a teenage boy from Sally's high school who committed suicide their junior year. He has since been haunting their high school, and when she goes to the class reunion, they meet up with each other to reminisce. As a suicide, Stevie does not get a door to the other side. He introduces Sally to Dylan and "Boner", but is later forced to shred Dylan after he tries to rape Sally after they possess bodies. Sally seeks his help when she needs to learn how to shred ghosts to save herself from the Reaper. But after the Reaper convinces her that she has to take over his role, he makes her first task to shred Stevie, as only they are allowed to shred ghosts. After Stevie states that he might shred the ghost of Van, his old bully, should he die, Sally realizes that the Reaper is right, just as the Reaper shreds Stevie. Stevie, after spending time in Limbo watching his family live on without him every day, is brought back to life along with Nick and Sally. After Josh gives him some money to get out of town, he and Sally find Stevie again when they try to warn his parents that he is alive and is craving flesh. When they find the house, they find Stevie inside, who reveals he had gone as far as Memphis before returning, seeing his parents for the first time since his passing, and ultimately causing their death due to the spell. Weeks later, he ate their corpses due to the hunger he felt from the reanimation, but then resorted to killing the mailman. As a last resort, he has been trying to kill himself by hanging, but chickens out at the last minute, and asks Josh and Sally to do it for him. After Josh manages to kill Stevie, his door appears, but when Sally notices that it is the same as Nick's from earlier in the day, she realizes something is wrong and warns him not to enter but is too late. After entering Donna's pocket dimension, Sally demands that Nick and Stevie be set free, but Aidan realizes that Donna must have already eaten their souls, which she confirms.
Mother (Deena Aziz) is the main antagonist in season 2 and the queen of all vampires (or at the very least, of those in North America), the "She" who wished to see Aidan in the season 1 finale. She built her vast empire from the ground up, and was fond of relating the story of her rise to power to her daughter, Suren. She comes to Boston to decide the fate of Aidan and Bishop's "orphaned" vampires. Though Aidan attempts to prevent their demise, she orders that Bishop's excess sires to be culled and Aidan not take his place (as Heggeman and the Dutch wanted), but instead assist her daughter in bringing Boston back under control. Mother promised Aidan freedom from the demands of the council and the vampire community should her daughter succeed. Mother later ordered Heggeman to assassinate Josh, who is a barrier to her plans for Aidan. Mother is the most powerful (and thus, probably oldest) vampire seen in the series thus far, both politically and physically. When Aidan and Suren fulfill the goals Mother set out for them, Mother keeps Suren in her position in Boston, despite her requests, and gives Aidan his freedom by banishing him from the vampire society. After Suren leaves him, Aidan plans to kill Mother, but she sees through the trap and captures him, presenting him to Suren to kill so she can be her successor. When Suren refuses, Mother stakes her and then commits Aidan to the ground, as Aidan tells her she has just killed the only person who ever loved her, after having been revealed in flashbacks that Suren is her biological daughter from when both were human. In the season 3 premiere, Mother is revealed to have died from the mysterious virus killing all vampires.
Cecilia (Oluniké Adeliyi) is a cop in the Boston Police Department who Suren chooses to be the new vampire liaison in the police. Aidan is first tasked with changing her, but when he does not, Suren does instead. When Nora and the twins kill Will, Josh turns to Cecilia to eliminate the case from the police department's radar in exchange for the twins. When she follows through with her side of the deal, Josh gives her Heggeman's rifle and the twins' address. However, they overpower her and use her as bait to lure in Aidan for a "McLean family vampire hunt" on the night of the full moon. Aidan finds her, but she is too weak and she tells Aidan to leave her behind. Aidan reluctantly respects her request, and she is torn apart by the four werewolves as he escapes.
Atlee (Kyle Gatehouse) is one of the Dutch who accompanies Heggeman on the trip to Boston when Suren is reinstated. He becomes suspicious when Heggeman mysteriously disappears after being tasked by an unknown, to him, task by Mother. He returns to Boston to question Aidan on Heggeman's disappearance, and gets tied up in Josh's lie to Cecilia that the McLean twins are responsible for Heggeman's death. After taking Atlee to hunt the twins, their plans are reversed when Josh, Nora, Connor, and Brynn all change and Atlee retreats, leaving Aidan to save Cecilia. Aidan later gives Atlee the corpse of Connor and tells him to never return to Boston. Aidan later confronts Atlee and blackmails him so he and Suren can remain in hiding, to which Atlee reluctantly agrees.
Dylan (Zack Peladeau) is a ghost and friend of Stevie, who is introduced to Sally. Dylan teaches Sally how to possess people, until he attempts to make use of their possessed bodies to rape her. Stevie intervenes and shreds him.
Phil (Jonah Carson), nicknamed "Boner" (it is implied that he lost his penis prior to death), is a ghost and friend of Stevie. He leaves after Stevie shreds Dylan, and the Reaper makes Sally believe that Stevie shredded him as well. But when Boner asks Sally what has happened to Stevie, she begins to realize the Reaper has not been telling her the truth.
Julia (Natalie Brown) is a physician who applies for residency at Suffolk County Hospital, meeting Aidan as she applies for the job. She and Aidan begin dating. When Aidan introduces her to Josh and Nora, she and Josh already know each other as she was his former fiancée. After this discovery, Aidan breaks off his relationship with her. After Josh and Nora break up, Emily inadvertently reunites Josh and Julia, and Julia reveals she has only come to Boston so she can see Josh, again. When their mutual friend Stu appears as a ghost to Josh, Stu does his best to try to keep Josh and Julia apart until he realizes that they want to be back together, using the opportunity to possess Josh, which rekindles their relationship, something Josh did not want to do to avoid revealing his lycanthropy to her. When Josh learns that he can cure himself by killing Ray, but discovers that Ray has reunited with his family, he decides to tell Julia the truth. But a solar eclipse reveals the information prematurely, and Julia recoils when Josh approaches her partially transformed.  She backs up into the street and is hit by a car.  After transforming back to human form Josh returns to the scene, but due to his affliction, he fails to realize that the Julia he meets is actually her ghost.  She has died from her injuries. She admits she always loved him, and he should have told her the truth from the start at which point her Door appears. She gives her final goodbye and passes through the Door.
Zoe Gonzales (Susanna Fournier) is a nurse at Suffolk County Hospital who has a sixth sense and can see ghosts. She keeps watch over the nursery where she controls whether or not ghosts get to be reincarnated into the babies in the nursery. After she denies Sally the option to be reincarnated, Sally pleads with her to help her with the dark force attacking her, and Zoe agrees. Zoe begins a relationship with Sally's ex-boyfriend Nick, even though he is a ghost. When the Reaper personality takes over Sally, Aidan and Josh plead with Zoe to help them, even though Zoe later learns that Sally shredded Nick. After saving Sally from the "Reaper", Zoe says she can never forgive Sally for shredding Nick and leaves the house. Sally later tries to reconcile with Zoe, who has given up working with ghosts because of all of the bad memories, until a solar eclipse starts bringing back all of the shredded ghosts. At the house, Zoe and Nick reunite for one last time, and after Nick lies that he is now in a better place and disappears, Zoe thanks Sally for reuniting them. Zoe later contacts Sally when she starts to feel afraid of Nick, as he bit her hard enough once to break the skin and has been watching her ever since. Her fears are later confirmed when she comes home to find Nick eating a cat, and then he lunges at her in hunger. She defends herself at the last moment, using a baseball bat that they had in the house, and after Nick warns her about what may become of Sally as well, she asks Sally to leave and never see her again.
Brynn (Tracy Spiridakos) and Connor McLean (Jon Cor) are a sister and brother pair of purebred werewolves, people who were born as werewolves rather than being turned. As such, their bodies are in a constant state of the feeling that Josh and Nora feel near the full moon, and must take wolfsbane to depress the urges. They are from a rich family, and when Josh mentions he is looking for a cure, Connor's interest is piqued until Connor and Brynn reveal that they wish to become the wolf all of the time. Josh turns down their offer, but later recants, knowing that with their funding he has the best chance to cure himself and Nora. They convince Nora to give into the instincts of the wolf, leading to their collective attack. Josh, becoming untrusting of them, tells Cecilia that they have killed Heggeman to remove the murder case, but when Cecilia goes to kill them they overpower her and capture her, putting Aidan in their grasp in his attempt to save Cecilia. During the full moon, they hunt down Aidan, with Josh and Nora, and together finish off a dying Cecilia. While Connor is gloating the next day for having brought out Josh's bad side when Aidan appears and shoots Connor with a silver bullet from Heggeman's gun, killing him immediately. Brynn breaks down and Aidan tells her to never return to Boston, before he turns in Connor's corpse to Atlee. Nora stays with Brynn after the event, but Nora returns to Boston, telling Josh that Connor was actually the one who kept Brynn in check rather than the other way around In season 3 Nora reveals to Josh she killed Brynn to protect a man she planned to kill for sport. 
Tim Forest (Martin Thibaudeau) is a new doctor at Suffolk County Hospital who Zoe has a crush on. Sally attempts to hook them up, but when Zoe begins a relationship with Nick Finn, instead, Sally takes the opportunity to possess Dr. Forest's girlfriend Janet Hines (Amber Goldfarb) to experience the love that they have for each other. Sally gets stuck in Janet's body and gets in trouble when Tim planned a visit from his mother so she could meet Janet, when the entity Sally believes is the "Reaper" attacks her, removing her from Sally's body. Months later, Sally learns that Janet is in the hospital's psychiatric ward because of Sally's memories mixed in Janet's. With Nora's assistance, Sally reveals the truth to Janet, and Janet is released from the psych ward.
Will (Sebastien Roberts) is Nora's ex-boyfriend who was highly abusive to her, resulting in a large portion of Nora's skin burned beyond repair. He shows up in Boston, working as a general contractor, causing Nora to recoil in fear. As it is near the full moon, Connor works to convince Josh to take his revenge against the man for harming Nora in the past, but when he does he realizes he is no better than Will. Later, Brynn approaches Nora who reveals she's known Will has come into town for some time, as her wolf was well aware of it, and Brynn convinces her to give into the wolf. That night, when the moon is at its fullest, the twins and Nora viciously attack Will, killing him for sport. His death brings the Boston Police onto Josh's trail, believing that he had something to do with the man's death. However, Cecilia interferes, using her vampiric suggestion powers to throw them off the trail, and Josh into her debt.
Samid (Joseph Antaki) and Rena Malik (Rahnuma Panthaky) are Sally's father and mother. Sally is reunited with them when Josh discovers that Rena is in Suffolk County Hospital and is dying. After Rena passes away, and Sally orders Josh to dress her in something other than a hospital gown, Sally wants to spend time with her mother, but Rena has other plans, namely reuniting with their old neighbor and her former lover Gerry Patterson (Graham Cuthbertson). This fact appalls Sally, but Rena later admits that she did not want to spend time with her because she still lives in the house she was murdered in. Sally later appeals to Rena to shred her so Sally can enter Limbo to save Nick and the others who she shredded. Rena refuses, and later goes to talk to Sally to tell her she is proud of what she has done and how strong she has become in the afterlife, causing her own Door to appear. Rena offers it to Sally, knowing that she will be able to go to Limbo, even if it means she will go crazy, as she knows Sally will find a way out. Sally, instead, shreds herself, letting her mother use her own Door.
Henry Durham (Kyle Schmid) is Aidan's vampire protégé who Aidan first met while Henry was a medic at a French field hospital during World War I. After a French soldier discovers Aidan's vampire nature, the soldier attacks him, and in the struggle stakes Henry. With no other choice, Aidan kills everyone in the hospital except for two: Henry, who he turns into a vampire, and another soldier, so Henry can have his first drink. Their relationship strained in the 1930s when Henry, who Aidan promised a better life like the one Mother and Suren have, decided to take matters into his own hands and beds Suren. However, he could not control his urges and slept with other women, leading to the massacre at the Halloway Hotel when Suren found him with another woman. Aidan ordered him to leave Boston and never return, but they meet in the present day after Suren is ordered to cull Bishop's orphaned vampires. After the urging of a vision of Bishop in his head, Aidan confronts Henry, but cannot find it in his heart to kill his own "son", and instead promises he will find a way for Henry to be reintegrated. This comes about when he has Henry gather up all of the orphans in a house owned by a man who offers passage over the threshold for money, and the house is passed into Suren's hands via her living liaison. Aidan saves Henry from being uninvited from the house, and presents him to Suren who literally takes her pound of flesh from Henry for her imprisonment by flaying him alive. Aidan takes Henry to the brownstone to recuperate, and brings him two women he has compelled to believe Henry is the most beautiful man in the world. Henry begins to take his fill from the two women, until Aidan's suggestion begins to wear off, leading Aidan to murder the girls and for Henry to drink them dry, healing rapidly. Henry is later Aidan's only compatriate in vampire society, having him deliver a message to Suren so the two can run away with each other. He is later sent by Mother to kill Aidan, but he helps Aidan survive, while hoping that just the two of them can survive on their own, without Suren. Instead, Aidan turns him away, and then asks for his help to kill Mother, but he is caught before the plan can be completed and is seriously injured. After the year passes, Henry saves Aidan from a pack of werewolves who have set traps in the black market on flu-free blood. He reveals he has stayed alive for the year due to his discovery of Emma who was never infected, and the two begin a relationship. However, it is all because Henry has Emma compelled to stay with him and he keeps her locked up in their apartment. When Aidan lets her free, Henry is angered as there is no certain way that they will be able to live, despite Aidan's promise that they will find a way. After weeks of failing to find clean blood, Henry gives into his hunger and eats from someone who had the flu. Aidan only discovers this when they go to drink from someone oJosh had found for them, but by then it is too late. He leaves Aidan's side, saying he has realized that all who come close to Aidan die, and later dies off-screen.
The Reaper is a malevolent shadow-like force that attacks Sally when she dreams of her doorway. She soon discovers it is not limited to her dreams when it begins attacking her in reality. The Reaper inadvertently removes Sally from Janet's body when she becomes stuck in her, but it soon begins to haunt Janet as well. When the spirit of the recently murdered Danny appears in the house to take revenge on Sally, the Reaper appears behind him and punches him through the heart, "reaping" his spirit. The entity then takes on a human shape (Dusan Dukic) confirming to Sally that it is indeed a Reaper. He reveals that Sally's existence after her Door is causing spiritual disorder, and that she is next to be Reaped. Danny's reaping has given her time to say her goodbyes. A week later, the Reaper comes to Sally as he has found a loophole: she has to become a Reaper. Sally reluctantly tries to learn from the Reaper but ultimately cannot bring herself to be one. However, after several of her ghost friends are reaped, it is revealed that the "Reaper" Sally has been seeing does not actually exist. The Reaper is simply a manifestation of Sally's own inner darkness, and that she has been the one reaping ghosts the entire time. Within Sally's mind, the Reaper personality takes on the name "Scott" and is Sally's fiancé, trying to take over Sally's soul by tricking her into moving out of the house in her mind. He traps Josh, Aidan, and Zoe in the brownstone on the chance that some of them will die, as it is a full moon and Aidan is in blood withdrawal. Zoe manages to get Sally to escape the Reaper's clutches, but when left alone she can still see the Reaper as he is a part of her personality. Only after Sally helps Janet Hines does she gain the strength to banish the personality from her thoughts. The Reaper returns again after Sally possesses Ray's wife, having slipped as he predicted, and begins to harass her, steeling herself to go into Limbo by any means necessary to alleviate the guilt she has for shredding the other ghosts and to find a way to bring them back. However, after her mother's Door appears, Sally decides to shred herself, sending herself to Limbo and destroying the Reaper in the process.
Beth (Erica Deutshman) and Holly (Imogen Haworth) are a pair of party girls that AIdan compels to the house so he can restore Henry to his full health after he was flayed alive. However, the illusion Aidan casts to hide Henry's fleshless body and their own bloodiness fails and he is forced to kill them. While suffering from a blood withdrawal a year later, they come to haunt him, taunting him to feed on people, including the sickly Kenny.
Stu (Jay Baruchel) was a mutual friend of Josh's and Julia's in college, who was killed on the camping trip by the werewolf that turned Josh several years ago. He reappears in Boston after learning from the Ithaca supernatural community that Josh is a werewolf. In reality, he has been following Julia as he has been in love with her since college, and wants to use Josh to experience that love. After he pushes Josh to not sleep with her, he possesses Josh and makes love to Julia, an event Josh did not want to happen because rekindling the relationship now that he is a werewolf would be just as dangerous as having a one-night stand. Stu watches from afar as Josh takes the former option, before leaving.
Chelsea (Catherine Bérubé) is a mutual friend of Josh and Julia's from back in Ithaca. She visits Boston when Julia reveals she has met someone, without revealing it is Josh. When they meet, Chelsea sternly tells Josh to reveal whatever secrets he may have, before leaving the two alone.

Season 3
Donna Gilchrist (Amy Aquino) is a witch that the medium Ilana (the exorcist Danny hired in season 1) directs Josh and Nora to in order to bring Sally back from Limbo. After charging them $2,000 and the heart of a person one of them has killed, she has them bring her Sally's body, as she is not simply bringing Sally back from Limbo but bringing her back to life. The incantation is successful, but she uses the spell to also locate the body whose heart she used: Ray. Donna appears once more when Trent walks through what appears to be his door, only to slice through Trent's spirit with a cleaver, reducing him to a pile of sawdust. She then eats some of the dust from the pile, and her face becomes younger. After Sally accidentally bumps into Robbie, she goes to Donna to beg for her to spare her brother's life. After declining the pleas, and after holding Josh and Sally away with her witchcraft, Donna reveals there is a way to save Robbie, and anyone else Sally might see, and that is for Sally to hand her soul over to Donna once she dies her natural death. Sally reluctantly agrees, while Josh realizes that Donna anticipated this exact chain of events. When Sally asks her what will become of her soul, Donna dismisses the question by saying it belongs to her now and she has no right to ask. After Nick and Stevie die as a result of their falling too deep into the hunger for human flesh, they both enter the same spiritual Door with a gilded clam on the outside. With Ilana's help, Sally realizes that the door leads to Donna rather than the afterlife, and when she finally dies her spirit will also pass through the door and straight to Donna. Sally, Josh, and Aidan pass through the door, discovering Donna has brought Ray back to life to be her guard dog, and Aidan and Sally confront Donna. Aidan realizes that Donna must have already eaten Nick's and Stevie's souls for sustenance, and when she goes to attack Sally to do the same, the incantation Ilana taught her begins to cause Donna to age rapidly. Although they believe it is weakening her, Donna reveals that it is only a "true face" spell, showing what she truly looks like after having been alive since at least the 17th century, admitting that the Salem witch trials were depressing. Donna says that she had originally planned to have some other use for Sally's soul, but Sally's insistence to know that plan and her resistance to death has made her change her mind, and she only plans on devouring her soul to regain her youth. Everything would have gone according to plan for her, as she knew that all who are brought back from the dead eventually feel the need to see their loved ones, and their souls would have gone her way, but once Sally demanded that her brother be saved, the deal changed and that would cause herself, Stevie, and Nick, to begin decomposing and becoming flesh-eating zombies. Just as Donna prepares to devour Sally's soul, Aidan reveals he has brought Sally's heart with him and throws it into a fire, intending to reverse the spell binding Sally to Donna. As flames begin to engulf Donna, she performs another incantation to send the flames to Sally, who realizes the futility of the situation and allows Donna to devour her soul. She is turned into sawdust and Donna breathes it in, regaining her youthful complexion, but she soon begins to radiate light and in a scream of pain explodes, sending Josh, Aidan, and Sally's spirit back to the house, seemingly defeating Donna for good. However, Sally later sees a set of candles Emily has blown out burn brightly again, and violently, before dying down, suggesting Donna is not yet out of their lives. She reveals herself to Sally, revealing that they are linked after her death at her hands, and brings Sally into a purgatory in order to keep either of them from disrupting the balance of the world with their magic powers. After Sally escapes through Donna's death spot at the hands of a bloodthirsty witch hunt in Amherst, she has Sally summon her to try to trap her, again, but this only results in the spellbook becoming a part of Sally. Sally later has to summon her once more to ask for help in reviving her brother Robbie, and through their time together she discovers that Donna was unjustly killed, having not been a witch at the time of her first death, and was then brought back to life by a coven of witches to be their new member. This also reveals to Sally the means to bring a person back from the dead without the consequences of Sally's first revival: another ghost must be sacrificed. Donna offers herself up as the sacrifice, but Robbie's reluctance to follow through ultimately leads to Donna asking Sally to let her spirit remain trapped between dimensions. During Sally's trip back in time, changing the course of history, Donna appears again after she discovers Saly is causing problems for herself in the timeline after her death. This iteration of Donna helps Sally return to her original timeline, but during the trip Sally observes a horrifying future.
Liam McLean (Xander Berkeley) is the father of the twins and, like his children, is a purebred werewolf. He admits that his parents and children said he was too impatient and too direct; Liam also thinks more like a wolf than a human, believing in packs and that Nora and Josh (who don't share the same beliefs) would join him. In overview, Liam seems insane. After discovering Connor's head mounted on a wall in the home of the remaining Dutch as a trophy, he makes it his mission to hunt down his son's killer. But first, he seeks out Nora as she was the last person that Brynn ever mentioned being with. She tracks Nora down on the night of a full moon, just as she is about to change in the storage unit. Although Nora tells him she has not seen Brynn in over a year, he decides to lock the two of them together so his wolf can sort out the truth. The two survive the night, as Liam says that werewolves do not kill each other, but Liam is still trying to find out what has happened to his children, including why Josh received $1,700 from Connor before his death, ultimately learning that Josh cured himself by killing Ray, but Nora adds that it was to save her. He is satisfied until he discovers that Aidan is alive and well, and healthy at that. He tasks the two with killing him, but Josh decides to hold Liam at gunpoint to tell him to stay away from Nora and Aidan. Later, Liam arrives at the house, having found Erin, and welcomes Josh into the pack. However, Liam's return of Erin to the house is all a ploy to kill Aidan, using Erin's apparent innocence to lure Aidan into a false sense of security, all to have her poison his clean blood supply with her own blood. The plan jumps ahead too far when Aidan returns home right after Erin taints the blood, and Liam rushes to the house at her call. Josh later realizes Liam is the one to blame for these events, but he cannot stop Liam from acting as he wishes. He goes to Erin while she is hospitalized, congratulating her on meeting her destined fate as a member of his pack, and smothers her with a pillow. Later, he stalks Blake who reveals to him that his son's killer is in Boston. He later tracks down Aidan, intending to kill him for having killed Connor and suspecting him of having killed Brynn. In the last moments before the full moon, he injects Aidan with virus-tainted blood, but is stopped from doing much damage by Josh who fires several rounds at him. In the escape from the transformed Liam, Josh is scratched by the werewolf. Liam lays low for the next several weeks until he appears outside Josh and Nora's honeymoon cabin, eye scarred over from Josh's silver knife attack at the last full moon, congratulating Nora on her marriage while she is outside getting firewood.
Trent (John Bregar) is one of Sally's friends from high school, having met through her brother Robbie. Despite Josh reminding Sally that Donna warned them that she could not see anyone from her past, Sally keeps Trent's company and attention, leading to a mutual attraction. Although intending to spend the night together, Trent suddenly falls ill and bids Sally a good night, intending to take her out on a proper date rock climbing. However, Sally and Josh discover Trent has mysteriously died the next morning, seemingly as a result of the blood magic used to bring Sally back to life. Sally does her best to help his spirit move onto the other side, even revealing that Trent cheated with her to his fiancée Candice, but she only reveals that she had been cheating on him for a year. Trent leaves angrily, and hours later discovers what appears to be his door. He walks through and finds himself in Donna's soup kitchen, where she reveals he will not be spending the afterlife anywhere anymore by slicing through him with a cleaver, turning him into a pile of sawdust.
Emma (Kimberly-Sue Murray) is Henry's girlfriend, having become a couple as she never caught the flu virus that kills vampires. After Henry offers her to Aidan so he can restore his strength, Aidan discovers that Emma is being kept prisoner through force and Henry's compelling powers, and she has even tried to take her own life. Rather than watch Emma die in apparent captivity, he lets her free, much to Henry's anger.
Erin Shephard (Lydia Doesburg) is a runaway 15-year-old who comes to Suffolk County Hospital to receive antibiotics for a scratch she received from a mangy dog during the last full moon. When Josh hears her story, he realizes that she has been attacked by a werewolf. After discussing with Nora, and scaring off Erin's social services worker, who reveals Erin has had many problems, they reveal to Erin that she is a werewolf, including showing footage from the storage unit. The night of the full moon, she and Nora go out to the woods for her first change. Nora believes it will happen to herself first, but Erin suddenly transforms and nearly attacks Josh in his car on the hill. Josh, brandishing a revolver with silver bullets, attempts to defend himself until Nora has completely changed and subdues Erin herself, first through physical strength, and then through their wolf bond. She stays with the group for a while, convincing Sally to try to get a new identity, until she runs away when Josh catches her with Nora's brother R.J. who is several years her senior. Josh and Nora try their best to find her, but Liam eventually delivers her back to their doorstep. However, it is all a plan Liam has put forward to get Erin to help him kill Aidan. He gives her a cellphone to communicate back to him, as she searches though the house for Aidan's blood supply. She taints it with her own blood, but the situation escalates when Aidan comes home just as she finishes her job. He drinks the blood, and realizes too late that it had werewolf blood in it. As he lies on the floor, bleeding from his orifices, she calls Liam who rushes to the house, all the while keeping her eyes on Aidan while holding a wooden stake. In defense, Aidan kicks her, slamming her into a wall, causing massive head trauma. She fades in and out of consciousness over the next few days, until Liam goes to her bedside, and proclaims she has done her part for the pack and smothers her with a pillow, killing her.
Max (Bobby Campo) is a mortician at the funeral home Trent has been taken to. At first annoyed by Sally's constant presence where she should not be. However, he acquiesces into getting Trent's fiancée Candice to talk to her. He later reveals that he is, in fact, jealous of how Sally managed to make the woman happy in such a sad time, and the two seem to hit it off. They meet again when Sally is looking through his files for a recently deceased child. She levels with him and reveals that she will need to, in the future, find a new identity and money to leave Boston. Max, instead, hires her as an assistant at the funeral home. The two quickly become intimate, but Max's mother Linda possesses Sally to break them up. Sally later makes Linda see the error of her ways, and she and Max become a couple once more. However, when Robbie appears in Boston, the way Sally acts with him around and not telling Max everything drives another wedge between them, almost ending the relationship after Sally leaves in the middle of the night to deal with Donna. However, Sally brings things back together by promising Max that there will no longer be any issue, as she has solved all problems with her former life. When Sally begins to rot, she tries to steal embalmer's wax from the mortuary, only for Max to find her. She reveals the truth about her status to him, and he is at first appalled, but later decides that he truly loves her and will help her hide her decomposition. However, when Aidan and Josh return from their confrontation with Liam, Sally's refusal to reveal anything to Max is the final straw and he ends their relationship. Sally and Max later reconcile for a brief moment and Sally tells him everything, including that she is dying. They say one last goodbye and kiss, departing on good terms, relieving Sally of any unfinished business she may have on Earth for a second time.
Robert (Richard Zeman), Lynette (Paula Jean Hixson), and R.J. Sargeant (Justin Bradley) are the father, mother, and younger brother, respectively, of Nora. Nora has been wary of introducing Josh to her family, apparently because her father is not fond of Jews, but she allows him (and Erin), where they discover the other reasons Nora has been reluctant. but Josh and Erin soon realize that they have their own problems. Lynette's sympathy for Will forces Nora to reveal to him that none of them really know the abuse she suffered, but they all have their ideas. Josh asks Robert permission to marry Nora, and he dismissively allows it, although giving him an apparent warning referring to his own wife. R.J. later appears at the brownstone, drunk, ready to celebrate Josh and Nora's engagement, but Nora does not believe him. While she goes out to get coffee to sober R.J. up, Erin sees that he has come over. The two who had hit it off at the birthday dinner, and R.J., unaware of Erin's real age, flirts with her. Josh comes home to see the two of them making out, and furious that R.J. is getting intimate with Erin who is only 15, attempts to kick R.J. out, and the two have a fistfight, only broken up with Nora's return. Before R.J. leaves, he makes a reference to Will, angering Nora even more.
Nurse Kerwin (Nadia Verrucci) is Aidan's superior at Suffolk County Hospital during the night shift. She introduces him to Kenny, and later in a nightmare Aidan is confronted about her about the blood he has been taking, and he kills her in the nightmare, only to awake to see it was a dream.
Kenny (Connor Price) is a patient at Suffolk County Hospital suffering from severe combined immunodeficiency ("bubble boy disease"), and as such has never been exposed to the atmosphere. Aidan starts to take care of him, and on the sly takes samples blood so he can be safe and clean. Kenny, a fan of horror movies, soon begins to suspect something is off, but as Aidan does not respond to the stereotypical vampire maladies, Aidan dismisses his questions, but soon realizes he may suspect otherwise. Feeling that he may be going crazy for having suspected Aidan of being a vampire, Aidan assuages Kenny's feelings of guilt by watching TV with him. However, after waking from a nightmare where he killed Nurse Kerwin, Aidan's vampiric features are brought forward, exposing Kenny to the truth. Over the next several days, Kenny presses Aidan for the truth, and Aidan finally gives in, particularly after Kenny offers his virus-free blood. However, days later, Kenny asks for Aidan to turn him. He denies the boy's request, saying it will change him forever, but Kenny can no longer emotionally live in isolation any more, and proclaims that after he turns 18 he will leave, even if his weakened immune system kills him. To that end he allows Blake to drink from him, under the pretense that she will turn him on his 18th birthday. However, she takes too much blood and severely weakens him to the point that Aidan steps in and promises he will be the one to turn him. He turns back to Blake after Aidan reveals he does not have much time left, but after Aidan's recovery he is glad to see Aidan will turn him once more. When Kenny is up for a bone marrow transplant, he gets worried of the failure rate and decides to advance his plans with Aidan, demanding that he be turned or he leaves the hospital on his own and dies from his weakened immune system. Aidan acquiesces and takes Kenny on a last day out as a teenager, including being taken along on Josh's bachelor party. However, Kenny's behavior, including glorifying his soon-to-be vampirism, causes Aidan and Josh to worry. When Kenny watches Aidan kill a vampire stripper planning to eat Josh, Kenny realizes the immortality is not absolute, but Aidan promises him that he will use all of his experiences in his past failures to make sure that Kenny has the best life possible. After turning Kenny and allowing him to sleep, Aidan discovers that he had accidentally turned another human recently, and he has been drastically deformed as either a result of the virus or the werewolf blood, and soon worries that Kenny will have the same fate. After chaining him up so everyone will be safe following his revival, Aidan goes to help Sally, and after Josh and Nora's wedding is unaware that Kenny has also been deformed after his turning. Kenny nearly kills Nora in his first blood lust, and Josh has Aidan kill him, but Aidan takes pity on him and lets him live. Kenny returns months later, apparently normal, and heading up Boston in the power vacuum after the virus. However, he is still severely deformed, but has the ability to compel other vampires to see him as normal. Although he tries to impress Aidan, trying to kill Josh, he ultimately needs his help in stopping the vampire slayer who has been attacking his blood dens, unaware that it is Aidan's wife Suzanna. Kenny later falls in love with Astrid, one of the new werewolves, and is saved by Aidan when Suzanna tries to get him to kill Kenny, only for Aidan to kill Suzanna instead. Kenny plans on leaving Boston with Astrid, but she is killed when the werewolves try to abduct Josh once more, and Ramona gets Josh to kill them all. Aidan lies to Kenny that Astrid was killed by the others, but her ghost appears to Kenny to reveal the truth. Kenny fumes with rage, wanting revenge, and is later let into the house by Ramona when he comes to kill Aidan and Josh. However, Aidan bests him in a fight, but not before Kenny compels him to believe that Josh has caused Sally to disappear forever, just before he disintegrates.
Kat Neely (Deanna Russo) is Nora's friend who is subletting her apartment while Nora has moved in with Josh. She comes to drop off a rent check with Aidan alone in the house, and his lack of blood and Beth and Holly's taunting cause him to come off as odd. Kat later goes back to the house while Erin is in the hospital, and Aidan helps her fix her plumbing, while also revealing her interest in early American history, to which Aidan is well acquainted. The two hit it off, and later he asks her out on a date, and she agrees. Aidan tries to break it off with her, for fear of retaliation from Nora, but he continues to see her until he is attacked by Liam. Kat tries to find out what has happened, prompting Josh's rescue, and after Aidan is infected, Nora invites her over so they can see each other one last time. After Aidan is cured, he approaches her at the university and passionately kisses her, while remembering his wife's words to him centuries before that he should seek out new love when he finds it. After a disastrous date at the Boston Rare Book Archives where Kat comes across her ex-boyfriend Jeff Westin (Malcolm Travis) and his new date Marissa (Meghan Gabruch), a college student who seems to be in the same situation Kat was in years ago, they reveal their plans for the future, in which Kat wants to have a family of her own, even though Aidan cannot provide this for her. They start to get intimate, only for Aidan to back away when the bloodlust overcomes him. Outside, after drinking from a blood bag he has with him, goes back to Kat and they sleep together. However, Aidan awakes in an alley hours later, unknowingly having killed and turned Jeff Westin. Kat is invited for Josh and Nora's wedding, where she is upset that Aidan left her alone after their first night together, but Aidan later apologizes by saying it had been a long time since he had last been intimate with someone and got scared, but promised that it would not happen again and they end up on good terms, with Aidan later admitting that Kat is his girlfriend. Kat later participates in the wedding, being one of Nora's bridesmaids alongside Emily and a spectral Sally.
Linda (Linda E. Smith) is Max's dead mother, who has been keeping watch over him ever since she died. Sally sees her and tries to prove she is not a bad person, but after Sally and Max have sex, Linda is disgusted with her and possesses her to break the two of them up. Sally realizes this when Linda taunts her the following day, and prepares to exorcise her from the funeral home (with the help of Zoe's Soul Lock pendant), but Linda laments that all she wants is her son's happiness. Sally convinces her that she can provide this happiness, and the two begin their relationship anew, now with Linda's blessing.
Robbie Malik (Jesse Rath) is Sally's younger brother. The two had a falling out before her death and did not see each other at all. He becomes the gang's new landlord after it is revealed their father inherited the house after Danny's death and he gave the landlord job to Robbie. Sally reveals that Robbie was a trouble child, as the last time she saw him was when he was being arrested for selling hits of nitrous oxide at her prom. Sally tries her best to avoid contact with him, fearing it will kill him, but the inevitable happens when they bump into each other late at night. After giving up her soul to Donna, Sally returns to apologize to Robbie, and discovers that the landlord claim was all a means to scam Aidan and Josh out of the rent check, as their father has not wanted anything to do with the house. Robbie calls her out on her apparent hypocrisy after she claims he did not go to their mother's funeral, but she reveals that everything regarding her supposed (although actual) death was a means to escape Danny. The two reconcile, and Robbie heads off to Florida for more quick money. He returns months later to try to scam the house out from under them, as his father no longer wants to be involved. Sally tries to thwart his plans, causing an incredible stench to scare away the first potential buyers, but she is sent back in time to watch how Robbie confront Danny before her death, revealing Robbie was worried for Sally's well-being during the time, but she only believed it was him causing trouble. After another potential family is scared away when their son is scratched by the "Lil' Smokie" spirit, Robbie tries to fix the plumbing, only for it to apparently fight back. His hand is almost mangled by the garbage disposal, and he is killed when the water boiler springs a leak that makes its way to his feet and a jigsaw he was using falls off of a table into the puddle, electrocuting him. Sally comes back from her trip in time to find him dead, and tries to find a way to bring him back to life, only for Robbie to decide that he should remain dead after all of the problems he caused while alive. Jesse Rath is Meaghan Rath's younger brother in real life.
Blake (Janine Theriault) is a recently turned vampire who finds Kenny, planning on using him to stave off the hunger while also planning on turning him once he turns 18. Aidan gets in the way of their plans, first by having her kicked out of the hospital, and then by promising to turn Kenny himself. She later crosses paths with Liam, revealing that the one who killed his son is in Boston. When Aidan is suffering from the virus, Blake makes herself known once more as Kenny plans on using her to turn. However, after Aidan revives, and informs Blake of the werewolf-blood borne cure, she leads a group of vampires in a trap for a werewolf where they all feed on his blood to stave off the virus.
Pete (Ron Lea) is a self-professed vegetarian werewolf that Nora meets after the full moon. After learning from him that the pack mentality is wrong and that wolves should only run with those they are bound by blood with or love, she offers an invitation to their house, which he takes for that very night. After making garlic tea for Aidan, and revealing he has also kept vampire friends and that he is only 39 years old (prematurely aged after years of transformations), he leads Josh and Nora in a meditation to reach their wolves, of which he has named his own "Gordon". Pete does his best to get Josh in touch with his wolf, offering to help them get through it in a single night in exchange for beer, but when Josh returns to Pete's RV, he finds him attacked by vampires seeking the blood cure, who also reveal that Josh and Nora are off limits. Pete is revealed to have died from the attack, and his death is taken hard by Nora, Josh, and even Aidan, who feels responsible for not including him in the protective deal, even though he only said a single drink was necessary.
Suzanna (Katharine Isabelle) is Aidan's wife from colonial times, taking care of their young son Isaac (Kyle Harrison Breitkopf) after it is assumed that Aidan has died in battle. Aidan returns to the homestead after being turned, weak and hungry, attacking one of their chickens, and Suzanna tends to him, feeding him, and falling in love with him, again. She says he is not a monster, as the hawk needs to kill just as he does, and she later pleads with him that after she is dead that if he should find love once more he should pursue it. Earlier in their marriage, the two were desperate to have a child, as the baby was never strong enough after birth. Although Suzanna pleads with Aidan to attend church, where their judgemental preacher uses their plight as a means to gather faith, Aidan refuses to go to church any longer, and lashes out at the preacher when he comes to visit them at their home. After Aidan prays and promises God that he will always be a good man from then on, Suzanna successfully gives birth to their son, Isaac. Suzanna is ultimately drowned for believed for being a witch, as Aidan returns to the village, and though Aidan takes revenge on the clergy for killing her, it is revealed Bishop brought her back to life as a vampire. In a blood lust, she accidentally kills Isaac, for which she punishes herself daily, and decides to use her eternal life to kill other vampires. After Aidan accidentally kills a girl, she forces him into an ultimatum to repent, and reveals the truth that she killed their son. However, she tasks Aidan to kill the new head of Boston. After Aidan reveals that it is his son Kenny, Suzanna allegedly gives him leeway to keep Kenny under control, but she takes matters into her own hands and attempts to force Aidan to kill Kenny himself, but in the last moment he stakes her.

Season 4
"Lil' Smokie" (Helen Colliander) is a young girl Sally watches get sacrificed to witches during one of her trips back in time. A later trip back in time leads her to her nickname as Sally discovers the young girl serving up cocktail weiners (little smokies) at a party in the 1970s some time before her death. With Zoe's help, Sally discovers the girl is Beatrice Benson, and they track her down only to discover Beatrice is alive and well (Mary Katherine Harvey) and her daughter is the spitting image of her as a child. Zoe believes they have met a dead end, but Sally spots the daughter staring at them from a second-story window, and later Beatrice examines a photo of her old house, the gang's greystone, to see a girl who could be her double doing the same. The spirit of "Lil' Smokie" seems to be malicious in the house, causing Robbie Malik's death and harming a young child. After Sally wakes up in the hidden room, and they break it open, an argument between Sally, Josh, and Aidan is interrupted by the spirit, revealing herself to be Ramona Benson, Beatrice's twin sister, who has been trapped in the house ever since. She wants to see her sister, again, and Sally asks Aidan to attempt to talk to Beatrice for him, but she is horrified when he reveals that he knows about Ramona. At the house, Ramona wants the "family" to stay, and when the pack tries to take Josh back, she traps him in the bedroom until he changes, allowing him to kill the whole pack to save Nora. When Aidan takes Astrid's corpse away from the house, having hidden it from Kenny, he does not realize that a dried bloodstain he spotted earlier with several new scratch marks in it has increased to having 12 scratch marks, noting the people who have since died in the house due to Josh's rampage. Beatrice later returns to the house to warn the group that her parents had joined a cult to Paimon, one of the Kings of Hell, and her sister, who her parents never even named, was sacrificed by the cult. Ramona appears, and kills Beatrice, believing she is responsible for her death, and then traps the four housemates in situations that would possibly result in their own deaths, as she no longer plans on letting anyone leave the house alive. When Sally confronts her, she finally reveals that she is not a ghost but the evil of the house given a corporeal form. Once all of the others are freed before any one of them can kill themselves, she lets Kenny into the house, knowing that it will ultimately lead to one of their deaths.
Caroline (Mylène Dinh-Robic) is a pregnant werewolf that Josh discovers on one of his jogs. She reveals herself, her husband Andrew (Tim Rozon), and several of their friends were all attacked by a werewolf on the same night three months prior, and after they came back, they finally conceived a child despite years of no success. However, she appears to be farther along with the pregnancy than she should be. An ultrasound discovers that the baby seems to be a werewolf in the womb, showing how it could have survived the three transformations. That same day, her water breaks, and with Josh and Nora's help, Caroline ultimately gives birth to a daughter they name April (Jaxen Dupuis and Jayden Dupuis), and the begin to form a pack with the other werewolves that were changed with them, revealed to Josh and Nora at the baby shower the two throw them. They later move out into the countryside to stay away from the city for April's safety, but it is all a ruse to use Josh to father a whole new pack of werewolves. Andrew is killed by Josh when he helps the pack take him back, and Ramona keeps Josh until he transforms.
Mark (James A. Woods) is the erstwhile leader of the pack of werewolves Caroline and Andrew join up with after their child's birth. Mark seems intent on forming a pack to protect themselves from the vampires, despite the truce between them, and is explicitly disdainful of their presence. Josh is wary of Mark, feeling that he is trying to be the alpha wolf, and after a confrontation with Aidan and Kenny, Mark leads the pack away from Josh and Nora. The two try their best to reintegrate with the new pack, doing their best to teach them their ways, but when Josh's wolf and the wolf of Mark's wife Wendy (Stephanie Lemelin) mate during the full moon, Josh tries to distance himself and Nora from them, aware of Mark's possessive nature, and how he might react to the affair, even if they were wolves. Wendy ultimately reveals the truth to Mark, and Mark attacks Josh, revealing the truth to Nora, but when he strikes Nora, Josh's wolf surfaces and he nearly kills Mark. Later, Josh attempts to reconcile with Mark and Andrew by revealing he now can change at will, and Mark decides to use this to his own advantage by having Josh sire a new pack of wolves as he is in control now. Josh refuses, and Mark stuns him and traps him in a cage, later fighting Aidan when he, Nora, and Sally try to save Josh. Mark is killed by Josh after being trapped by Ramona.
Astrid (Kalinka Petrie) is a young werewolf who takes a liking to Kenny, even though they are both aware of each other's natures. Aidan uses her presence in Kenny's life as a way to try to convince him his new way of running Boston is wrong, and later she is instrumental in revealing to Aidan, Sally, and Nora, that Mark, Andrew, and Caroline have Josh captive. Astrid is killed when Josh attacks the pack, and as a ghost, she reveals the truth about her death to Kenny, who has been led to believe by Aidan that the pack killed her first.
"Brick Shithouse" (Kwasi Songui) is one of the werewolves, having an imposing figure due to his height and weight. When a fight breaks out during the baby shower between the werewolves and Aidan and Kenny, his arm is broken in the melee, but he heals later and joins the others in the first change as a pack. At the housewarming party, Brick is one of the werewolves Aidan and Sally fight off, with Sally possessing him after the others have fallen to use his body to express her feelings for Aidan (after her trip back in time) in a passionate kiss. He is among the werewolves killed by Josh when they try to kidnap him, again.

References

External links
 

Characters NA
Being Human
Being Human
Being Human